The 2012 Atlantic Sun Conference baseball tournament was held at Melching Field at Conrad Park on the campus of Stetson University in DeLand, Florida, from May 23 through 26.  won their second consecutive and second overall championship with a 10–4 championship game victory over .  The Bruins joined the Ohio Valley Conference beginning with the 2013 season.  Belmont earned the Atlantic Sun Conference's automatic bid to the 2012 NCAA Division I baseball tournament.

Format and seeding
The 2012 tournament was a 6-team double-elimination tournament.  The top six teams (based on conference results) from the conference earned invites to the tournament.

Bracket and results

All-Tournament Team
The following players were named to the All-Tournament Team.

Most Valuable Player
Judah Akers was named Tournament MVP.  Akers was a first baseman for Belmont.

References

Tournament
ASUN Conference Baseball Tournament
Atlantic Sun baseball tournament
Atlantic Sun baseball tournament